Radio and Television Broadcasting Centre Jemiołów (RTCN Jemiołów) - is a 314 metre tall guyed mast for FM and TV, and concrete tower about height 99 meters, situated at Jemiołów, Lubusz Voivodeship in Poland.
This FM and TV centre which was built in years 1960-1962 from funds assembled socially.
There is main broadcast station of Lubusz Voivodeship.

Transmitted Programmes

FM Radio

Digital Television MPEG-4

See also
 List of masts

References

External links
 http://emi.emitel.pl/EMITEL/obiekty.aspx?obiekt=DODR_W1A 
 http://radiopolska.pl/wykaz/pokaz_lokalizacja.php?pid=126
 http://www.przelaczenie.eu/mapy/lubuskie
 http://www.dvbtmap.eu/mapcoverage.html?chid=9366

Radio masts and towers in Poland
Świebodzin County
1962 establishments in Poland
Towers completed in 1962